Lake Meelva is a lake of Estonia.

See also
List of lakes of Estonia

Meelva
Räpina Parish
Meelva